Cecilia Cassini is an American fashion designer. She started her career at the of age 10 in 2009. Michelle de Castro Cassini is her mother. She is a Latina from Encino, California, and in 2010, lived in Los Angeles. She takes part in New York fashion week.

Cassini was part of a reality show, Fashion Week Trends, 2012.

References

American fashion designers
American women fashion designers
Living people
People from Encino, Los Angeles
Year of birth missing (living people)
Sierra Canyon School alumni
21st-century American women